Joe Allen (born 1990) is a Welsh international footballer.

Joe Allen may also refer to:

 Joe Allen (footballer, born 1909) (1909–1978), English footballer
 Joe Allen (painter) (born 1955), British artist
 Joe Allen (restaurant), Broadway restaurant opened in 1965
 Joe Allen (writer) (born 1960), American author, journalist, historian, and activist
 Joe Allen (basketball) (1945–1997), American basketball player

See also
 Joey Allen (born 1964), lead guitarist of Warrant
 Joey Allen (sailor), New Zealand sailor
 Jo Allen (disambiguation)
 Joseph Allen (disambiguation)